Baryancistrus longipinnis is a species of catfish in the family Loricariidae. It is native to South America, where it occurs in the Tocantins River basin in Brazil. The species reaches 20 cm (7.9 inches) in total length.

References 

Loricariidae
Catfish of South America
Fish of the Tocantins River basin
Fish described in 1895